Hole Rock is the largest of several rocks lying close north of North Foreland, the northeastly cape of King George Island, in the South Shetland Islands. It was charted in 1937 by Discovery Investigations personnel on the Discovery II and so named because a conspicuous hole extends through it.

References

Rock formations of King George Island (South Shetland Islands)